Last Exit to Brooklyn is the fifth soundtrack album by British singer-songwriter and guitarist Mark Knopfler, released on 3 October 1989 by Vertigo Records internationally, and by Warner Bros. Records in the United States. The album contains music composed for the 1989 film Last Exit to Brooklyn, produced by Bernd Eichinger and directed by Uli Edel.

Critical reception

In his review for AllMusic, William Ruhlmann gave the album three out of five stars, calling it Knopfler's "most ambitious and accomplished soundtrack." Ruhlmann noted that unlike Knopfler's first three soundtracks, the music for Last Exit to Brooklyn "did not sound like outtakes from Dire Straits sessions, but instead consisted of fully orchestrated scoring."

Track listing
All music was written by Mark Knopfler.

Personnel
Music
 Guy Fletcher – keyboards
 Mark Knopfler - guitar (5)
 David Nolan – violin (4)
 Irvine Arditti – violin (9)

Production
 Mark Knopfler – producer
 Bill Schnee – mixing
 Don Cobb – digital editing
 Denny Purcell – remastering
 Jonathan Russell – remastering assistant

References

External links
 Last Exit to Brooklyn at Mark Knopfler official website
 

1989 soundtrack albums
Drama film soundtracks
Mark Knopfler soundtracks
Vertigo Records soundtracks
Warner Records soundtracks